Zagreb Film Festival (ZFF) is an annual film festival held since 2003 in Zagreb, Croatia. Focusing on promoting young and upcoming filmmaker, the festival is widely considered to be one of the most important and influential cultural events in Croatia. It also regularly features several international programmes for the filmmaker's first or second films made.

Each festival edition usually features three international competition programs (for feature films, short films, and documentary films), and one short film competition program for Croatian filmmakers. In addition, the festival often hosts non-competitive screenings, such as selections of children's films or screenings of debut works made by established film directors.

Since 2006 the festival's main award is called Golden Pram. From 2003 to 2005 the main award was called Golden Bib.

Awards 

Prizes are awarded in the following categories:

 The Zlatna kolica (Golden Pram) (called Golden Bib until 2005) award is given in the following categories:
 Best Feature Film in the international selection
 Best Short Film in the international selection
 Best Documentary Film in the international selection
 Best Short Film by a Croatian author (introduced in 2005)
 The VIP Audience Award for best film overall, as voted by audience (introduced in 2005)

Award winners

Best Feature Film

Best Documentary Film

The Golden Pram for Best Croatian Film

External links

References

Film festivals in Croatia
Recurring events established in 2003
Culture in Zagreb
2003 establishments in Croatia